Language, Proof and Logic is an educational software package, devised and written by Jon Barwise and John Etchemendy, geared to teaching formal logic through the use of a tight integration between a textbook (same name as the package) and four software programs, where three of them are logic related (Boole, Fitch and Tarski's World) and the other (Submit) is an internet-based grading service. The name is a pun derived from Language, Truth, and Logic, the philosophy book by A. J. Ayer.

On September 2, 2014, there was launched a massive open online course (MOOC) with the same name, which utilizes this educational software package.

Description
A short description of the programs:

 Boole (named after George Boole) - a program that facilitates the construction and checking of truth tables and related notions (tautology, tautological consequence, etc.);
 Fitch (named after Frederic Brenton Fitch) - a natural deduction proof environment in Fitch-style calculus for giving and checking first-order proofs;
 Tarski's World (named after Alfred Tarski) - a program that teaches the basic first-order language and its semantics using a model theoretic-like approach, where the "world" consists of a little grid and some simple objects;
 Submit - a program that allows students to submit exercises done with the above programs to the Grade Grinder, the online grading service.

References

External links
Home page
1st edition of Language, Proof and Logic at Internet Archive
massive open online course (MOOC) of Language, Proof and Logic

Educational software
Logic
Digital media works about philosophy